Sterling Sports Cars is an American automobile company that designed and manufactured assembly kits for replicars and supercars.

Current models
The "component cars" and parts manufactured by Sterling Sports Cars LLC. were sold as components. The cars were not pre-assembled by Sterling Sports Cars but were intended to be assembled by the purchaser or by a third-party. The Sterling was originally designed to be fitted to a VW Beetle floor pan. A tube frame was engineered as a test mule to find out the capabilities of a mid-engine design using the Subaru powerplant. The engine intruded into the cockpit, making seating space at a premium and no further testing was performed.

The company also sold replacement parts to owners around the world who own an original Sterling car.  In the UK, the Sterling was copied from the Nova kit car. The name Nova was already copyrighted by General Motors in the United States in the 1970s, and "Sterling" was chosen as the new name.

In April 2017 The Sterling Sports car company was purchased by the owner of SPECTOR INC.

In May 2019 The Sterling Sports car company was sold to a private individual in an effort to maintain a supply line of body parts and car-specific items for current owners.

External links
 Sterling Sports Car Company
 National Sterling : Sterling Sports Car Owners Association 
 History of the Sterling, Sovran, and Sterling GT kit cars

Kit car manufacturers